James Cotter (1869–1948) was a member of the New Zealand Legislative Council from 9 March 1936 to 8 March 1943; and 9 March 1943 to 30 April 1947, when he resigned. He was appointed by the First Labour Government.

He was from Hinuera in the Waikato.

References 

1869 births
1948 deaths
Members of the New Zealand Legislative Council
New Zealand Labour Party MLCs
People from Waikato